Pitäjänmäki station is a station on the Helsinki commuter rail network located in western Helsinki, Finland.

References

External links 
 

Railway stations in Helsinki
Pitäjänmäki